Mont Mokoto is a mountain located in the South Pacific, on the island of Mangareva.

References

Mountains under 1000 metres
Mountains of French Polynesia
Mangareva